Levyraati ("Record Panel") was a Finnish television show which ran from the 1961–1992 originally on YLE and starting from 1992 on MTV3. It was based on the British Juke Box Jury.

The show was originally hosted by Jaakko Jahnukainen and for a brief period by Vesa Nuotio (in 1980). However, the show was most famously hosted by Jukka Virtanen from 1980 till 1997 when the show went on a five-year hiatus. For its 2002–2003 run it was hosted by Raakel Lignell and later by Ruben Stiller. The show has been on unspecified hiatus since 2005.

In the program Finnish celebrities (mostly musicians) would rate recordings and, in later years, music videos with a score from 1 to 10. With four guests in the panel the maximum score was 40 and the winning song or video would be performed during the ending credits. One of the panel members was a frequent guest placed among three weekly guests.

Today Levyraati has also become a popular game practiced amongst friends and family who form the panel and play music from personal collections. The rating-system varies.

Similar programmes
 Videoraati, MoonTV's take on the popular format, hosted by Wallu Valpio.
 Runoraati was a version of the show on YLE in which a panel rates poems sent by amateur poets.

References

External links 
 

Finnish television shows
Musical game shows
1961 Finnish television series debuts
1997 Finnish television series endings
2002 Finnish television series debuts
2005 Finnish television series endings
MTV3 original programming
Finnish non-fiction television series